Campbell Dallas Emory (December 23, 1839 – March 11, 1878) was an officer in the American Civil War. He served as Aide de Camp to Major General George Meade.

Early life
Campbell Dallas Emory, eldest son of Matilda Wilkins (née Bache) and Major General William H. Emory, was born on December 23, 1839, in Philadelphia, Pennsylvania. His great-great-grandfather was Benjamin Franklin. Like his father, Campbell Emory graduated from the United States Military Academy, West Point, on May 6, 1861. He graduated as a second Lieutenant in the 6th United States Infantry Regiment, he transferred to the 9th United States Infantry Regiment; where he rose in rank throughout the American Civil War. From December 1863 to the end of the war, Capt. Emory served as the Aide de Camp to Major General George Meade.

Personal life
On December 29, 1864, Campbell Dallas Emory married Clara Tilton, a daughter of Commander Edward Gibson Tilton, U.S. Navy in Washington, D.C. This union had five known children: Matilda, George Meade, Josephine, Clara and Elizabeth.

Lieut. Colonel Campbell Dallas Emory died on March 11, 1878, in San Antonio, Texas. He was buried at Oak Hill Cemetery in Washington, D.C.

References

External links

1839 births
1878 deaths
People from Philadelphia
People of Pennsylvania in the American Civil War
Burials at Oak Hill Cemetery (Washington, D.C.)